Audrey Goldstein Fleissig (née Audrey Ellen Goldstein; born April 14, 1955) is a United States district judge of the United States District Court for the Eastern District of Missouri. She also is a former United States Attorney.

Early life and education 
Born in St. Louis, Missouri, Fleissig earned a Bachelor of Arts degree in 1976 from Carleton College and a Juris Doctor in 1980 from Washington University School of Law. During her third year of law school, she worked as a law clerk for Judge Edward Louis Filippine, a judge on the United States District Court for the Eastern District of Missouri.

Professional career 
From 1980 until 1991, Fleissig worked for a St. Louis law firm, first as an associate (from 1980 until 1989), and then as a partner (from 1989 until 1991). In 1991, Fleissig became an Assistant United States Attorney in St. Louis, a post she held until becoming a full United States Attorney in 2000. She served as a United States Attorney from 2000 until 2001, when she again became an Assistant United States Attorney. Later in 2001, Fleissig became a United States magistrate judge, a position she held until becoming a United States District Judge in 2010.

Federal judicial service 
In February 2009, Fleissig submitted her resume for a federal district court vacancy in St. Louis to United States Senator Claire McCaskill. In August 2009, McCaskill personally interviewed Fleissig. After interviews with representatives of the United States Department of Justice and the White House, Fleissig was nominated on January 20, 2010 to the position by President Obama, to replace Judge E. Richard Webber, who took senior status on June 30, 2009. On March 4, 2010, the United States Senate Committee on the Judiciary sent Fleissig's nomination to the full Senate. The full Senate confirmed Fleissig in a 90–0 vote on June 7, 2010. She received her commission on June 9, 2010. As of Oct. 1, 2018, she is Chair of the Committee on Court Administration and Case Management (CACM) of the Judicial Conference of the United States, and has continued in that role through at least June 2019.

References

External links

1955 births
Living people
Assistant United States Attorneys
Carleton College alumni
Lawyers from St. Louis
Judges of the United States District Court for the Eastern District of Missouri
United States Attorneys for the Eastern District of Missouri
United States district court judges appointed by Barack Obama
21st-century American judges
United States magistrate judges
Washington University School of Law alumni
21st-century American women judges